The following is a list of all the occasions in which a golfer has won eight or more tournaments on the PGA Tour in a season. It is complete through 2019–20.

Byron Nelson's record 18 victories came in a year when many potential rivals were in military service. Ben Hogan missed half the PGA tour season while both Lloyd Mangrum and Jimmy Demaret missed virtually the entire season. Hogan and Demaret played in only 2 of Nelson's 11 straight tournament wins and Mangrum played in none.

Most PGA Tour wins in two consecutive seasons

Most PGA Tour wins in three consecutive seasons

References

See also
Most European Tour wins in a year

PGA Tour, year
PGA Tour